Konnagar Municipality is the civic body that governs Konnagar and its surrounding areas in Srirampore subdivision of Hooghly district, West Bengal, India.

History
Konnagar Municipality was established in 1944. Sib Chandra Deb contributed tirelessly towards the development of Konnagar. After independence a large number of displaced persons from East Pakistan came and settled in Konnagar.

Geography
Konnagar Municipality covers an area of 4.67 sq km and has a total population of 76,152 (2011).

In 1981, 27.09% of the total population formed main workers and 72.91% were non-workers in Konnagar Municipality and 49.26% of the total main workers were industrial workers. This may be interpreted as follows: although industrial activities are prominent in the municipal areas of the region, the major portion of the population is commuters and migrants find employment in the area.

Healthcare
Konnagar Matri Sadan O Sishu Mangal Pratisthan, with 43 beds, is located in the Konnagar Municipality area.

List of councillors
(2022-present)
 Swapan Kumar Das - AITC (Chairman)
 Goutam Das - AITC (Deputy Chairman)

Elections
In 2022 municipal election once again Trinamool Congress got the majority and formed the Konnagar municipality Board. 

In the 2015 municipal elections for Konnagar Municipality Trinamool Congress won 11 seats, CPI (M) 4 seats and  Congress 5 seats.

In the 2010 municipal elections for Konnagar Municipality Trinamool Congress won 10 seats, CPI (M) 7 seats and Congress won 3 seats.

About the 2010 municipal elections, The Guardian wrote, "Today's municipal elections are unlike any for decades: the Communists, who have held West Bengal's main towns almost without a break since the 1970s, are facing disaster… This time defeat is likely to be definitive and could signal the beginning of the end for the Communist Party of India-Marxist (CPIM)."

In the 2005 municipal elections for Konnagar Municipality, CPI (M) won 12 seats, Congress 3 seats, Trinamool Congress 2 seats and others 2 seats.

References

 

Municipalities of West Bengal